General Giuseppe Mancinelli (1895–1976) was Chief of the Italian Defence Staff from 1954 to 1959 and chairman of the NATO Military Committee from 1956 to 1957.

During World War II he served as Chief of Staff of the liaison office with Panzer Army Africa from March 1942 to January 1943, and Chief of Staff of the First Italian Army in Tunisia, serving under Marshal of Italy Giovanni Messe, from January 1943 until its surrender on 13 May 1943. He was then a prisoner of war in Great Britain until 1944.

References

External links 
http://www.quirinale.it/elementi/DettaglioOnorificenze.aspx?decorato=32622

NATO military personnel
Grand Crosses with Star and Sash of the Order of Merit of the Federal Republic of Germany
Italian Army
1895 births
1976 deaths
Italian generals
Italian military personnel of World War II